Li Wei Resigns from Office is a 2005 Chinese television historical drama and the last of the Li Wei trilogy, after Li Wei the Magistrate (2001) and Li Wei the Magistrate II (2004). It was written by Yuyue, the same writer as the 2001 (and the better-received) series.

In Li Wei Resigns from Office, the Yongzheng Emperor had died as his son, the Qianlong Emperor, succeeded the throne. As a result, all actors from the first 2 series were replaced by older actors, but some fictional characters from the first 2 series were still kept. Veteran Hong Kong actor Paul Chun stars as an older Li Wei.

Filming began in Jinzhong, Shanxi in October 2004. It was first broadcast in Taiwan on China Television in November 2005.

Cast and characters
Paul Chun as Li Wei
Yu Bo as Qianlong Emperor
Cheng Pei-pei as Li Wei's mother
Deric Wan as Li Xiaowei
Xie Fang as Empress Xiaoshengxian
Yang Junyi as Fuheng
Hu Xiaoting as Shiliu
Hao Bojie as Yue Xiaoman
Yang Guang as Empress Xiaoxianchun
Li Yanbing as Haiju
Wu Jiahui as Liu Bao
Tong Xiaohu as Wang Pu
Liu Sitong as Consort Fu

References

2005 Chinese television series debuts
2005 Chinese television series endings
Television series set in the Qing dynasty
Mandarin-language television shows
Chinese historical television series